Brownwood Coliseum is a 4,000 seat multi-purpose arena in Brownwood, Texas, United States.  Built in 1963, it is the home of the Howard Payne University Yellow Jackets basketball and volleyball teams.

References 

Indoor arenas in Texas
College basketball venues in the United States
Buildings and structures in Brown County, Texas
Sports venues completed in 1963
1963 establishments in Texas
Basketball venues in Texas
College volleyball venues in the United States